The 1883–84 season was the sixth season in the history of West Bromwich Albion Football Club. Albion played their home matches at the Four Acres during the season, and the team wore a chocolate and white coloured kit. The club competed in the FA Cup for the first time, losing in the first round. They did reach the final of the Staffordshire Senior Cup, but were defeated by St George's in the final. Albion also participated in the Birmingham Senior Cup, Birmingham Charity Cup and Wednesbury Charity Cup, but were eliminated at the semi-final stage of all three competitions.

FA Cup

Having joined The Football Association in the summer of 1883, West Bromwich Albion became eligible to take part in the FA Cup for the first time. Their first season in the competition was not a successful one however, as the team lost 0–2 to local rivals Wednesbury Town in the first round.

Source for match details:

Birmingham Senior Cup

Albion took part in the Birmingham Senior Cup for the third time. In the first round, they won 7–0 against Stourbridge Standard, then defeated Walsall Alma Athletic 6–0 in the second round. Albion drew 1–1 with Wednesbury Old Athletic in round three. George Timmins scored a hat-trick in the replay, but the match finished 3–3, meaning that a second replay would be required. Albion won 3–1 at Aston Lower Grounds. After a 1–1 draw against Wolverhampton Wanderers, Albion won the fourth round replay 2–1. In the semi-final, Albion lost 0–1 to Walsall Swifts at Aston Lower Grounds.

Source for match details:

Staffordshire Senior Cup

Albion entered the 1883–84 Staffordshire Senior Cup as defending champions, having won the trophy at the first attempt during the previous season. The club's second season in the competition saw them defeat Cocknage in the first round, George Bell scoring the only goal of the game. In the second round, Harry Aston scored all four goals in the club's 4–0 victory against Walsall Town. The semi-final took place in Wednesbury, against Stoke; goals from Billy Bisseker and George Timmins put Albion into the final for the second successive season. Their opponents in the final were St George's, who had knocked Albion out of the Wednesbury Charity Cup two weeks earlier. The match took place at Stoke's Victoria Ground in front of 5,500 spectators. Arthur Loach scored for Albion, but the team failed to retain the cup as St George's were 2–1 winners.

Source for match details:

Birmingham Charity Cup

Aston Villa beat Albion 4–1 in the semi-final of the Birmingham Charity Cup. This was the first time that Albion had participated in this competition.

Source for match details:

Wednesbury Charity Cup

Taking part in the Wednesbury Charity Cup for the second time, Albion defeated Aston Unity 3–0 in the first round. The semi-final took place at Aston Lower Grounds and finished in a 1–1 draw between Albion and St George's. In the replay at Wednesbury, St George's won 4–0.

Source for match details:

Friendly matches

As league football had yet to be established, West Bromwich Albion took part in a number of friendly matches throughout the season.

Source for match details:

See also
1883–84 in English football

Footnotes

References 
Citations

Sources

West Bromwich Albion F.C. seasons
West Bromwich Albion